Rosie Garland (born 1960) is a British novelist, poet and singer with post-punk band The March Violets.

Life 
Born in London on 8 May 1960, as a baby she was adopted by her mother Mary Garland (née Metcalfe) and father William Garland, spending her childhood living in Hampshire, Somerset, Devon and Hertfordshire. In 1978, aged 18, she moved to Yorkshire to study at the University of Leeds, graduating with a BA Hons in English Special Studies and an MA (with distinction) in Medieval English Studies. In 1980 she joined The March Violets. During 1984-1986 she worked as an English Teacher in Sudan. From 2001 she was the victim of a stalker, with the 2007 court case featured as a lead article in the Manchester Evening News. In 2009 she was diagnosed with throat cancer and successfully treated at The Christie Hospital in Manchester.

Career 
She has published seven solo collections of poetry. As a performance poet, she has often given readings as her alter-ego Rosie Lugosi, Lesbian Vampire Queen and has performed on the cabaret circuit in British troupe Lesburlesque. In 2001 she won the Performance Artist category in the Sexual Freedom Awards.

Her debut novel The Palace of Curiosities won the inaugural Mslexia Novel Competition in 2012 and was published by HarperCollins. This work is set in a Victorian freak show, where the central character Eve has hypertrichosis, a condition where the entire body is covered in hair. This was followed by a second novel, Vixen and a third novel The Night Brother, which is set in her adopted city of Manchester.

In 2018 she became inaugural Writer-in-Residence at The John Rylands Library, Manchester. In 2019 she was selected by Val McDermid, who had been asked by the National Centre for Writing and the British Council to choose ten writers to showcase the quality and breadth of LGBTQI+ writers working in the UK.

Awards and Shortlistings 

 2012 Winner, Mslexia Novel Competition
 2013 Winner, Cooperative Bank 'Loved By You' LGBT Book of the Year 2013

Works

Poetry 

 Hell and Eden (Dagger Press, 1997)
Creatures of the Night (purpleprosepress, 2003)
 Coming Out at Night (purpleprosepress, 2005)
 Things I Did While I Was Dead, 2010, 
 Everything Must Go, 2012, 
 As In Judy, 2016, 
 What Girls Do In The Dark, 2020,

Novels 

 The Palace of Curiosities , 2013, 
 Vixen, 2015, 
 The Night Brother, 2017,

Reviews 

 Judith Flanders (6 April 2013). "The Palace of Curiosities by Rosie Garland – review". The Guardian.
Claire Booker (5 January 2017). "As in Judy: Rosie Garland, Flapjack". Write Out Loud.
Dr Claire Nally (28 July 2018). "'The Night Brother' by Rosie Garland – guest review". The Blogging Goth.
Juliano Zaffino (15 October 2020). "What Girls Do in the Dark by Rosie Garland". Lunate Fiction.

References

External links 
 http://www.rosiegarland.com/
 https://harpercollins.co.uk/blogs/authors/rosie-garland
 https://www.hollandparkpress.co.uk/authors/rosie-garland/
 http://booksbywomen.org/rosie-garland/
 https://wordmothers.com/2015/02/09/interview-with-author-rosie-garland/
 https://www.theskinny.co.uk/sexuality/deviance/rosie-garland-the-palace-of-curiosities
 http://simon-bestwick.blogspot.com/2016/12/the-lowdown-with-rosie-garland.html
 https://www.cultureword.org.uk/writer-of-the-month-rosie-garland/

Living people
21st-century English women writers
1960 births
British poets
British women poets
British lesbian writers
British LGBT poets